Brachysomus is a genus of beetles belonging to the family Curculionidae.

The genus was first described by Schoenherr in 1823.

Synonym: Platytarsus Schoenherr, 1840

Species:
 Brachysomus echinatus

References

Entiminae
Curculionidae genera